Christos Yfantidis (born 30 November 1952) is a retired Greek football striker.

References

1952 births
Living people
Greek footballers
Veria F.C. players
Panathinaikos F.C. players
Doxa Drama F.C. players
Super League Greece players
Association football forwards
Greece international footballers
Naoussa F.C. managers
Greek football managers
Footballers from Central Macedonia
People from Krya Vrysi, Pella